South Suburban School (Main)  was established in 1874. It was located at Hazra Pukur (now Jatin Das Park) in Kolkata, India. At that time it was known as South Suburban School, Kalighat. Pundit Sibnath Sastri was the first head-master. After a few years the school's name was changed to South Suburban School, Bhowanipur. The school was relocated to Govinda Bose Lane (its current location). The secondary building of the school was built in 1888 by an Italian engineer and its primary building was built in 1908. 

Asutosh College was established by the school. The school helps other schools including L.M.S. Institution (now known as South Suburban School (Branch), Sir Ramesh Mitra Balika Vidyalaya and Chakraberia High School.

School anthem
The national anthem of India is chosen as the anthem of the school.

Campus
The school is located at Gopal Banerjee Street. There are two buildings and each building has its own playground, the bigger one is known as

Uniform
The uniform of the school is a white shirt with ash colour shorts or trousers, white socks and black shoes. On Physical Education days a white trouser and white cades are worn instead. In winter navy blue sweaters are allowed. The school emblem of "S" is on the pocket of the shirt.

Notable alumni
 Ashutosh Mukherjee, academic administrator
 Premendra Mitra, poet, novelist and short story writer
 Uttam Kumar, actor
 Rabi Ghosh, character artist and comedian 
 Sisir Kumar Das,  poet, playwright, translator, and scholar
 Tarun Kumar Chatterjee, actor

Activities
The school has an NCC curriculum having Army, Air and Naval wings. Students participate in the Republic Day March in Delhi.

There is a cricket team which participates in the school level tournaments.

The school has an organisation named "NatureLovers" that organises coastal trekking, jungle trekking, high altitude trekking, Traverse Himalayan Trekking Expedition, adventure cum nature study course, cycling expedition, tree planting, blood donation camps, free health checkup camps, and an environmental awareness program. The President of the Organisation is the Headmaster.

See also
Education in India
List of schools in India
Education in West Bengal

References

External links
List of Schools affiliated to West Bengal Board of Secondary Education in Kolkata

Boys' schools in India
Schools in Colonial India
High schools and secondary schools in West Bengal
Schools in Kolkata
Educational institutions established in 1874
1874 establishments in India